The office of Downing Street Chief of Staff is the most senior political appointee in the Office of the Prime Minister of the United Kingdom, acting as a senior aide to the Prime Minister of the United Kingdom. The holder of the office retains a highly powerful, non-ministerial position within His Majesty's Government. 

The role of Chief of Staff initially had executive authority, vested by the Prime Minister, and at the time of its inception, was referred to as the most powerful unelected official in the UK and possibly ranked third in government, after the elected Prime Minister and the Chancellor of the Exchequer. Since 2007,  the role does not have legal or executive authority, although the post holder remains, by definition, the senior adviser to the Prime Minister, and controls access to the Prime Minister and their staff. 

From 1997 to 2019, and from November 2020, the title of Chief of Staff has been held by the most senior special adviser at Downing Street. Steve Barclay, the Member of Parliament for North East Cambridgeshire, has served as Chief of Staff from February 2022 to July 2022, following the resignation of Dan Rosenfield. He was the first MP to serve in this capacity, and also retained his position as Chancellor of the Duchy of Lancaster, and a Cabinet Minister, compounding the Chief of Staff's power and access in UK Government.

The incumbent chief of staff is Liam Booth-Smith, who was installed in the position by Rishi Sunak upon his accession as prime minister in October 2022.

Description 
The Chief of Staff is an appointed special advisor or a career civil servant who is personally and politically close to the Prime Minister. The responsibilities of the post have varied according to the wishes of the sitting Prime Minister. Since the Chief of Staff is at the centre of the Downing Street operation, he or she will always be influential and closely involved in government policy formulation and implementation, political strategy and communication, and generally advising the Prime Minister.

History 
The first official chief of staff in 10 Downing Street was David Wolfson, under Margaret Thatcher from 1979 to 1985. The position of Downing Street Chief of Staff was recreated by Tony Blair upon his becoming prime minister in 1997 and Jonathan Powell held the post for ten years.

In 1997 Tony Blair gave his chief of staff, a special advisor, 'unprecedented powers' to issue orders to civil servants. Previously the Cabinet secretary had been the most senior non-ministerial figure in the British Government, and along with the principal private secretary to the prime minister had supported the prime minister in the running of 10 Downing Street. Following the creation of the role, the chief of staff supplanted the principal private secretary in running Downing Street operations and effectively replaced the power of the Cabinet secretary in terms of co-ordinating government policy.

Although the Cabinet secretary continued to be a highly important role, through remaining responsible for making sure that the civil service was organised effectively and was capable of delivering the Government's objectives, the chief of staff replaced the Cabinet Secretary as the "right-hand man" for the prime minister.  "Powell had been at the epicentre of power. As Tony Blair's chief of staff, he was the ultimate fixer, the prime minister's first line of defence against events, baby-catcher in chief. When things went wrong, people called Powell."

When Powell stood down as chief of staff at the end of the Blair premiership in June 2007, the incoming prime minister, Gordon Brown, temporarily appointed civil servant Tom Scholar as both Downing Street chief of staff and principal private secretary to the prime minister. This was changed upon Scholar's scheduled departure in January 2008, when the title chief of staff was divided amongst two posts in an attempt to split the political policy communication role from the management of civil servants within Number 10. As such, senior civil servant Jeremy Heywood replaced Scholar as principal private secretary to the prime minister, a position he had held under Tony Blair several years earlier, with the role of chief of strategy and principal advisor to the prime minister (effectively chief of staff) being given to political advisor Stephen Carter.

After less than a year in the post Carter resigned, becoming a minister and receiving a peerage amid speculation that his part of the chief of staff role had insufficient authority to direct cross-government operations. Heywood continued as both principal private secretary and Downing Street Chief of Staff for the remainder of the Brown Premiership. Upon David Cameron becoming prime minister in May 2010, Heywood returned to the civil service, enabling him to be appointed as the first Downing Street Permanent Secretary. He was replaced as Downing Street chief of staff by Conservative advisor Edward Llewellyn. Cameron also created the role of Downing Street deputy chief of staff, with responsibility for supporting the chief of staff, which was given to Catherine Fall.

Theresa May appointed two joint chiefs of staff in Nick Timothy and Fiona Hill upon becoming prime minister in 2016. Former minister Gavin Barwell succeeded Timothy and Hill after the 2017 general election. The formal title was out of use between July 2019 and November 2020, under prime minister Boris Johnson, when the role was overseen by Dominic Cummings as chief adviser and Edward Lister as chief strategic adviser. However, during this time, Cummings was noted to be the de facto chief of staff. When Cummings departed Downing Street, Johnson appointed Lister as acting chief of staff. 

Lister was succeeded by Dan Rosenfield on a permanent basis. In February 2022, following months of scandal owing to Partygate, Rosenfield, alongside other senior aides Martin Reynolds, Munira Mirza and Jack Doyle, resigned. He was replaced by Steve Barclay, the first MP to hold the position. Barclay served concurrently as Chancellor of the Duchy of Lancaster, giving him notable power over Whitehall operations.

Five months later, the resignation of Sajid Javid during the July 2022 United Kingdom government crisis caused a vacancy in the office of Secretary of State for Health and Social Care, which Barclay was appointed to fill shortly prior to Boris Johnson's resignation as prime minister. While no successor was formally appointed, Simone Finn, Baroness Finn held the role in a de facto, acting capacity. 

On 6 September 2022 Mark Fulbrook, a veteran Conservative party strategist was installed in the role as part of the incoming Truss ministry. Upon Rishi Sunak becoming prime minister on 25 October 2022, he installed long-term adviser Liam Booth-Smith as chief of staff, making Fullbrook the shortest-serving chief of staff in the office's history.

List of Downing Street Chiefs of Staff

See also 
 Chief of staff
Chief of Staff to the Prime Minister (Canada)
White House Chief of Staff
Prime Minister's Office

References 

 
1979 establishments in the United Kingdom
British Prime Minister's Office
10 Downing Street